Myrcene, or β-myrcene, is a monoterpene. A colorless oil, it occurs widely in essential oils.  It is produced mainly semi-synthetically from Myrcia, from which it gets its name. It is an intermediate in the production of several fragrances. α-Myrcene is the name for the isomer 2-methyl-6-methylene-1,7-octadiene, which has not been found in nature.

Production

Myrcene is often produced commercially by the pyrolysis (400 °C) of β-pinene, which is obtained from turpentine. It is rarely obtained directly from plants.

Plants biosynthesize myrcene via geranyl pyrophosphate (GPP), which isomerizes into linalyl pyrophosphate. The release of the pyrophosphate (OPP) and a proton completes the conversion.

Occurrence
It could in principle be extracted from any number of plants, such as verbena or wild thyme, the leaves of which contain up to 40% by weight of myrcene. Many other plants contain myrcene, sometimes in substantial amounts. Some of these include cannabis, hops, Houttuynia, lemon grass, mango, Myrcia, West Indian bay tree, and cardamom.

Of the several terpenes extracted from Humulus lupulus (hops), the largest monoterpenes fraction is β-myrcene. One study of the chemical composition of the fragrance of Cannabis sativa found β-myrcene to compose between 29.4% and 65.8% of the steam-distilled essential oil for the set of fiber and drug strains tested. Additionally, myrcene is thought to be the predominant terpene found in modern cannabis cultivars within North America. Interestingly, photo-oxidation of myrcene has been shown to rearrange the molecule into a novel terpene known as "hashishene" which is named for its abundance in hashish.

It is found in the South African Adenandra villosa (50%). & Brazilian Schinus molle (40%) Myrcene is also found in Myrcia cuprea petitgrain (up to 48%), bay leaf, juniper berry, cannabis, and hops.

Use in fragrance and flavor industries
Myrcene is an intermediate used in the perfumery industry.  It has a pleasant odor but is rarely used directly.  It is also unstable in air, tending to polymerize.  Samples are stabilized by the addition of alkylphenols or tocopherol. It is thus more highly valued as an intermediate for the preparation of flavor and fragrance chemicals, such as menthol, citral, citronellol, citronellal, geraniol, nerol, and linalool. Myrcene is converted to myrcenol, another fragrance found in lavender, via hydroamination of the 1,3-diene by diethylamine followed by hydrolysis and palladium-catalyzed removal of the amine.

Both myrcene and myrcenol undergo Diels-Alder reactions with several dienophiles such as acrolein to give cyclohexene derivatives that are also useful fragrances, for instance Lyral.

Myrcene also contributes a peppery and balsam aroma in beer.

As of October 2018, the U.S. FDA withdrew authorization for the use of myrcene as a synthetic flavoring substance for use in food, without regard to its continuing stance that this substance does not pose a risk to public health under the conditions of its intended use.

Health and safety 
In 2015, beta-myrcene was added to California's Prop 65 list of chemicals known to the state of California to cause cancer or reproductive harm.

See also 
 Perfume allergy

References 

Flavors
Polyenes
Perfume ingredients
Monoterpenes